Andrey Valentinovich Agafonov (born 29 January 1979) is a former Russian professional footballer.

Club career
He played in the Russian Football National League for FC Dynamo Barnaul in 2008.

References

External links
 

1979 births
Living people
Russian footballers
Association football midfielders
Degerfors IF players
FK Ventspils players
FC Spartak Vladikavkaz players
FC Dynamo Barnaul players
Skonto FC players
Latvian Higher League players
Russian expatriate footballers
Expatriate footballers in Latvia
Russian expatriate sportspeople in Latvia
Expatriate footballers in Sweden